Roller speed skating has been an included sport at the World Games since its introduction in 1981. From 1997 and onwards inline skates have been used.

Medalists

Track skating

Men

300 metres time trial

500 metres sprint

1,000 metres sprint

1,500 metres sprint

3,000 metres in line

5,000 metres

5,000 metres point

10,000 metres

10,000 metres elimination

10,000 metres point

10,000 metres point elimination

15,000 metres elimination

15,000 metres point elimination

20,000 metres

20,000 metres elimination

Women

300 metres time trial

500 metres sprint

1,000 metres sprint

1,500 metres sprint

3,000 metres

5,000 metres

5,000 metres elimination

5,000 metres point

10,000 metres

10,000 metres elimination

10,000 metres point elimination

15,000 metres

15,000 metres elimination

Road skating

Men

Marathon

200 metres time trial

500 metres sprint

10,000 metres points race

20,000 metres elimination race

Women

Half-marathon

200 metres time trial

500 metres sprint

10,000 metres points race

20,000 metres elimination race

References

External links
Sport Komplett - Ergebnisse World Games - Rollschnelllaufen
World Games at Sports123 by Internet Archive
2005 World Games info system

 
Sports at the World Games
World Games